Schoonouwen is a town in the Dutch province of South Holland. It is a part of the municipality of Krimpenerwaard, and lies about 8 km southeast of Gouda.

The statistical area "Schoonouwen", which also can include the surrounding countryside, has a population of around 160.

Until 2015, Schoonouwen was part of Vlist.

References

Populated places in South Holland
Krimpenerwaard